Deon Dewald Smith (born 30 March 1968) is a South African former cricketer who is the current coach of South Western Districts at South African provincial level. His first-class player career for Boland spanned 1991 to 1994.

Born in Stellenbosch, Smith made his first-class debut in January 1991, against Border during the 1990–91 season of the Castle Bowl (the second division of the Currie Cup). A right-arm fast bowler who batted with the opposite hand, in his first match he took 2/26 and 4/59, which included the wicket of South African international Peter Kirsten in both innings. Despite his debut performance, Smith played only irregularly for Boland over the following years, although he did play the entire 1993–94 season for the Boland second XI (known as Boland B). That team had gained first-class status for a single season only, following the senior Boland team's promotion to the main division. Smith's only five-wicket haul, 5/80 from 31.3 overs, came against Griqualand West in the first match of the 1993–94 season. His final match at first-class level came in March 1994, when Boland played the touring Australians. Smith finished his career with 22 wickets from 11 matches, and made exactly the same number of runs, which came at a batting average of only 2.44.

Smith was appointed coach of South Western Districts for the 2006–07 season, its inaugural season in the CSA Provincial Competitions, and remained in the role until the end of the 2008–09 season. In August 2014, he was re-appointed coach of the team for the 2014–15 season, and in June 2015, it was announced that he had been retained for the following 2015–16 season, including the inaugural Africa T20 Cup.

References

External links
Player profile and statistics at Cricket Archive
Player profile and statistics at ESPNcricinfo

1968 births
Living people
Boland cricketers
People from Stellenbosch
South African cricket coaches
South African cricketers
Cricketers from the Western Cape